Cup noodle is a registered trademark of Nissin Foods and is known as precooked instant noodle with flavoring powder and/or seasoning sauce sold in a polystyrene, polyethylene, or paper cup. The flavoring can be in a separate packet or loose in the cup. Hot water is the only ingredient that is needed separately. Cooking takes 3–5 minutes. Now, many kinds of precooked instant noodle have been consumed around the world, as a popular staple.

History 

In 1971, Japanese food company Nissin Foods introduced Nissin Cup Noodles, a cup noodle to which boiling water is added to cook the noodles. A further innovation added dried vegetables to the cup, creating a complete instant soup dish. Both Cup Noodle and Cup Noodles are registered trademarks of Nissin Foods.

Precooked instant noodles sold in a cup by country

South Korea 

Keop-ramyeon is famous in South Korea. Popular instant noodles include Nongshim's Bowl Noodle Soup, Shin Cup Noodle Soup and Samyang's Hot Chicken Flavor Ramen.  South Korea has the largest quantity of consumption of instant noodle or precooked instant noodle's country per year. Based on market research, males consume more precooked instant noodle than females in South Korea. It is the second largest food type after steamed rice that contributes to the overall energy intake of individuals in South Korea. Furthermore, the younger generation (20 to 49 years old) are more likely to consume them and the demographic of consuming bowl-type noodles are the middle class or high class.

Mexico 
Precooked instant noodle was introduced in 1990 by Maruchan. Due to its popularity, instant noodles are often referred to simply as "Maruchan". Today, many local brands such as "La Moderna" and "Herdez" have developed their own instant noodles, along Nissin, which is also a newcomer.

Philippines 
Brands available in the Philippines include Lucky Me, Payless, Nissin (unrelated to Japan's Nissin Foods), QuickChow, Maggi and Ho-Mi. They are sold in packets, sealed paper cups, or sealed foam food containers.

Sweden 
Precooked instant noodles are usually sold for 10 SEK per package.

United Kingdom 

A common form of instant noodles in Britain is Pot Noodle, a cup noodle first marketed by Golden Wonder in 1977, and acquired by Unilever in 1995. These use artificial flavorings and are generally suitable for vegetarians (there is no chicken in "Chicken and mushroom flavour" Pot Noodles, for example) and are sold by virtually every major supermarket chain, general groceries shops, and convenience stores. Boiling water is added to the noodles to cook them.

United States 
In 1972, Nissin Foods introduced "Nissin Cup Noodles" in a foam food cup, which led to an upsurge in popularity. Soon after, many other competing companies were offering similar instant noodle products.

See also 
 Instant noodles

References 
9.

Noodles
Chinese noodles
Japanese inventions
Instant foods and drinks
Japanese noodles